The 2018 United States House of Representatives elections in New Mexico were held on November 6, 2018, to elect the three U.S. representatives from the state of New Mexico, one from each of the state's three congressional districts. The elections coincided with the gubernatorial election, as well as other elections to the House of Representatives, elections to the United States Senate and various state and local elections.

The Democratic party gained the 2nd Congressional seat, gaining unitary control of New Mexico's Congressional (House and Senate) delegation for the first time since 2008 and improving the advantage in the House delegation for New Mexico from 2–1 in favor of Democrats to 3–0.

Overview
Results of the 2018 United States House of Representatives elections in New Mexico by district:

District 1

The 1st district is centered around the Albuquerque metropolitan area. Democrat Michelle Lujan Grisham, who had represented the district since 2013, was reelected to a third term with 65% of the vote in 2016. Lujan Grisham did not run for reelection and instead successfully ran for Governor of New Mexico.

New Mexico's 1st district was one of 36 Democrat-held House districts targeted by the National Republican Congressional Committee in 2018.

Democratic primary

Candidates

Declared
 Antoinette Sedillo Lopez, former law professor and executive director of Enlace Comunitario, an anti-domestic violence non-profit
 Deb Haaland, former chair of the New Mexico Democratic Party and nominee for Lieutenant Governor of New Mexico in 2014
 Damian Lara, attorney
 Damon Martinez, former United States Attorney for the District of New Mexico

Withdrew
 Pat Davis, Albuquerque city councilman (endorsed Haaland)
 Dennis Dinge, physicist
 Annie Chavez, Sandia National Laboratories government relations official

Declined
 Terry Brunner, USDA Rural Development state director and former state director for former U.S. Senator Jeff Bingaman
 Jacob Candelaria, state senator
 Tanya Giddings, Bernalillo County assessor
 Javier Martinez, state representative
 Ken Sanchez, Albuquerque city councilman
 Michael Padilla, state senator
 Maggie Hart Stebbins, Bernalillo County commissioner

Polling

Endorsements

Pre-primary convention results 
Candidates for the Democratic nomination needed to either receive the votes of 20% of the delegates at the convention on March 10, or collect and submit signatures to the secretary of state to have made it to the June 5 primary.

Results

Republican primary

Candidates

Declared
 Janice Arnold-Jones, former Albuquerque city councilwoman (2013–2014) and former state representative (2003–2011)

Declined
 Richard Berry, former mayor of Albuquerque (2009–2017)
 Wayne Johnson, Bernalillo County commissioner
 John Sanchez, Lieutenant Governor of New Mexico and nominee for Governor of New Mexico in 2002

Results

Libertarian primary

Candidates

Declared
Lloyd Princeton, business consultant

Results

General election

Polling

Results

District 2

The 2nd district is very expansive, covering rural Southern New Mexico, including Alamogordo, Las Cruces, and Roswell. Republican Steve Pearce, who had represented the district since 2011 and previously represented the district from 2003 to 2009, was reelected to a fourth consecutive and seventh total term with 63% of the vote in 2016. Pearce did not run for reelection and instead ran unsuccessfully for Governor of New Mexico.

New Mexico's 2nd district was one of the 80 Republican-held seats that the Democratic Congressional Campaign Committee was targeting in 2018. It was successfully picked up by the Democrats.

Democratic primary

Candidates

Declared
 Madeline Hildebrandt, U.S. Army veteran and history professor
 Xochitl Torres Small, water rights attorney

Withdrew
 Adolf Zubia, former Las Cruces Fire Chief
 Tony Martinez, former pharmaceutical industry executive

Declined
 Joe Cervantes, state senator (running for Governor)
 Howie Morales, state senator and candidate for Governor of New Mexico in 2014 (running for Lieutenant Governor)

Pre-primary convention results 
Candidates for the Democratic nomination needed to either receive the votes of 20% of the delegates at the convention on March 10, or collect and submit signatures to the secretary of state to have made it to the June 5 primary.

Results

Republican primary

Candidates

Declared
 Gavin Clarkson, former professor at New Mexico State University
 Clayburn Griffin, former staffer for Gary Johnson's 2012 and 2016 presidential campaigns
 Yvette Herrell, state representative
 Monty Newman, former mayor of Hobbs and former chair of the Republican Party of New Mexico

Withdrew
 Aubrey Dunn, New Mexico Commissioner of Public Lands (running for U.S. Senate as a Libertarian)

Endorsements

Results

General election

Polling

Results

District 3

The 3rd district covers Northern New Mexico, including the capital Santa Fe, as well as Farmington, Las Vegas, and Taos. The district also expands into parts of rural Eastern New Mexico, taking in Clovis and Portales. Democrat Ben Ray Luján, who had represented the district since 2009, was reelected to a fifth term with 62% of the vote in 2016.

New Mexico's 3rd district was one of 36 Democrat-held House districts targeted by the National Republican Congressional Committee in 2018.

Democratic primary

Candidates

Declared
Ben Ray Luján, incumbent U.S. Representative

Results

Republican primary

Candidates

Declared
Jerald McFall, farmer and former ski instructor

Results

Libertarian primary

Candidates

Declared
Christopher Manning, auditor

Results

General election

Polling

Results

References

Notes

Partisan clients

External links
Candidates at Vote Smart 
Candidates at Ballotpedia 
Campaign finance at FEC 
Campaign finance at OpenSecrets

Official campaign websites of first district candidates
Janice Arnold-Jones (R) for Congress
Deb Haaland (D) for Congress

Official campaign websites for second district candidates
Yvette Herrell (R) for Congress
Xochitl Torres Small (D) for Congress

Official campaign websites for third district candidates
Ben Ray Luján (D) for Congress
Jerald Steve McFall (R) for Congress

2018
New Mexico
United States House of Representatives